This page describes the declension of nouns, adjectives and pronouns in Slovene. For information on Slovene grammar in general, see Slovene grammar.

This article follows the tonal orthography. For the conversion into pitch orthography, see Slovene national phonetic transcription.

Grammatical categories 
Nouns are declined for six cases and three numbers. Adjectives and most pronouns additionally decline for three genders.

Cases 
There are six cases (the Slovene names are given in brackets):

 Nominative ( or )
 Genitive ( or )
 Dative ( or )
 Accusative ( or )
 Locative ( or )
 Instrumental ( or )

Traditionally, the cases are given in the order above. They are also usually numbered accordingly: the nominative case is the first case, the genitive the second, and so on.

The nouns are usually listed and sorted by their nominative singular form, but declension is defined by the genitive singular form. For this reason, genitive singular form is commonly written with the nominative. Where it is not otherwise noted, the second form is in genitive singular form.

Vocative 
Vocative ( or ) was used with the original endings in Slovene up to the 18th century by, for example Janez Svetokriški, but has now received the endings of the nominative case. Colloquially, vocative endings are still present, but the current use is taken from Serbo-Croatian.

While having the same endings, it is still tonemically different from the nominative case, always having circumflex accent, but because of its similarity with nominative, it is often omitted from declension tables or is considered a special case of nominative, called 'addressive nominative' in Slovene literature.

Numbers 
Slovene has three numbers:

 Singular, which refers to one object.
 Dual, which refers to a pair of objects.
 Plural, which refers to more than two objects.

There is, however, an exception to that rule. Plural is used instead of dual for nouns that represent things that usually come in pairs (such as body parts, socks, twins, and parents), except if one wants to stress that the noun relates to both parts and after words that signify a pair (such as  'both', etc. ):
 . (I asked parents if I can go out.) – plural is used.
 . (Both parents have to sign the application.) – dual is used.

Genders 
A noun in Slovene can have one of the following three genders:

 Masculine (abbreviated ); divided further into animate (accusative singular equals genitive) and inanimate (accusative singular equals nominative) in the first and fourth masculine declension, and in first adjective declension.
 Feminine (abbreviated )
 Neuter (abbreviated ); which is in some dialects masculinized or feminized.

Native speakers usually identify a gender by placing a demonstrative pronoun  'that' in front of it. Since some nouns can only have a singular form and some only a plural form (extremely rarely also only dual, such as  'pisces'), both singular and plural endings must be remembered. Note that the feminine singular and neuter plural endings are the same so the number must be determined first.

Non-native speakers in most cases determine try to determine gender from the ending of a noun in nominative singular.

A number of feminine nouns end in a consonant; these are mostly "i-stem" and "v-stem" nouns.

Declensions 
Declensions are divided differently in international and Slovene literature. In Slovene literature, the declensions are defined by the ending in genitive singular, but in international literature, the nouns are often divided by the stem (the same way as in Proto-Slavic), which are more numerous. Thus, they can be considered as a subdivision of the declension. The stem declensions that are a subdivision of the main declension are a result of a stem lengthening alteration, or is a subpattern.

There are four different noun declension for every gender in Slovene and two for the adjectives. Besides the name, the identifying ending (ending in genitive singular) is written:

Masculine:

 Masculine o-/e-stem declension
 Masculine t-stem declension
 Masculine n-stem declension
 Masculine j-stem declension
 Second masculine declension (masculine a-stem declension); ending  (except )
 Third masculine declension (masculine declension without endings); ending 
 Fourth masculine declension (maculine i-/e-stem declension); ending 

Feminine:

 First feminine declension; ending , genitive plural ending is not 
 Feminine a-stem declension
 Feminine r-stem declension
 Feminine v-stem declension
 Feminine n-stem declension
 Second feminine declension (feminine i-stem declension); ending 
 Third feminine declension (feminine declensions without endings); ending 
 Fourth feminine declension (feminine i-/e-stem declension); ending , genitive plural ending 

Neuter:

 First neuter declension; ending 
 Neuter o-/e-stem declension
 Neuter n-stem declension
 Neuter s-stem declension
 Neuter t-stem declension
 Second neuter declension (neuter a-stem declension); ending 
 Third neuter declension (neuter declension without endings); ending -ø
 Fourth neuter declension (neuter i-/e-stem declension); ending -ega
Adjective:

 First adjective declension (adjective declension with endings); ending 
 Second adjective declension (adjective declension without endings); ending

Accentual types 
There are four different accentual types:

 Fixed, where the stress is always on the same stem syllable.
 Mobile, where the stress is on different stem syllables.
 Ending, where the stress is always on the ending.
 Mixed, where the stress is sometimes on the stem and sometimes on the ending.
In first masculine, second feminine and first adjectival declension, accentual types affect the endings in some cases.

Some words can also change accent from fixed to mixed in one number or in only one case. These nouns follow accent changes of the fixed type, except where they change to mixed type (they follow mixed accentuation). Some nouns can also change the accentuation after certain prepositions. These forms are always circumflex (for example, accusative singular , but after , it changes into ).

Degrees of comparison 
There is a three-stage and two-stage comparison in Slovene.

The three-stage comparison has the following degrees:

 Positive ( or )
 Comparative ( or )
 Superlative ( or )

The two-stage declension has the following degrees:

 Positive ( or )
 Elative ( or )

Animacy 
Maculine nouns and adjectives are divided between animate and inanimate nouns.

Animate nouns are nouns that represent a living or mythological being ( 'French',  'crab',  'ghost') and words that originally had that meaning, but have a different one now ( (a type of wine),  'monkey wrench',  'Orion'). In this category are also card names and suits, and some names of cars and mushrooms, such as  'ace',  'club',  (Golf, a Volkswagen car), and  'bolete'. The word  is animate when it means 'ghost' or 'mentality'. Some diminutives are animate, even if they represent an inanimate object (for example,  'little chair' ). Names of space objects that are named after gods are either animate or inanimate (e. g.   'Mercury')

This distinction is also applied to all words that modify the noun, such as adjectives, determiners and the like. Thus, adjectives in the masculine accusative singular will have either the form of the nominative (no ending or ), or the form of the genitive.

Nouns, nominal pronouns, nominalized adjectives 
The declensions for nouns, nominal pronouns, and nominalized adjectives can be split by gender, as gender and declension pattern coincide. The dual and plural are not distinguished in the genitive and locative cases of nouns; the plural form is used for the dual as well. For neuter nouns, the nominative and accusative forms are always the same, in all numbers.

Nominal and nominalized pronouns also follow this inflection patterns, however most of them are irregular. For irregularities among pronouns, see the pronouns section.

First Masculine declension 
First masculine declension follow nouns whose genitive singular ending is -a, -u (mọ̑st mostȗ), and the noun dan (dȃn dnẹ̑). The vast majority of masculine nouns are declined following this inflection pattern. It is so common that masculine nouns following the second (and some following the third and the fourth) can be declined following the pattern of the first.

Masculine nouns are further divided between animate and inanimate nouns. This difference is only significant for the accusative singular.

 For inanimate nouns, the accusative singular is identical to the nominative singular. For example,  'chair', genitive singular , accusative singular .
 For animate nouns, the accusative singular is identical to the genitive singular. For example,  'boy', genitive singular , accusative singular .

Masculine o-/e-stem declension 
The standard declension of first masculine declension is the o-stem declension. O-stem nouns are divided between "hard" and "soft" stems, see the main Slovene grammar article for the meaning of these terms.

Masculine t-stem declension 
Proper names ending in  normally follow this declension like the noun  'kid', adding the infix  before the endings. For example,   (a male name). This declension also follow some other nouns ending in  if it represents hypocoristicity (  'boy, immature man'). The noun  'father' also follows this declension.

Some historic Greek names, such as  'Xenophon' and  'Ajax the Great', also follow this inflection pattern, however, it is also common to already have a t-stem in nominative singular (/ , / ).

Masculine n-stem declension 
A few nouns ending  in  have a stem ending in  rather than dropping the fill vowel. These nouns can be also declined normally, however, that is less common.

Some Latin names ending in  can also follow this inflection pattern, such as   'Cato', but the  can be already added in nominative singular.

Masculine j-stem declension 

There are exceptions, though. Monosyllabic words follow the o-stem declension (  'peace'), except   'tsar', and similarly also  (old way of measuring cereal),  'bolete, 1000 units of currency' and  'priest'. Nouns derived from verbs, such as  'speech',  'source' and  'penetration' also follow o-stem declension. Some nouns, such as  'Hungar',  'north', and  'Algiers' also follow the o-stem declension. Note that in loanwords, the vowel can be written differently than expected, such as    'Disney' (but     'Broadway'). Note that Latin and Greek words can have an ending that ends with a consonant in nominative singular, but they are still j-stem nouns (  'Ovid').

Alternations and other exceptions of the first masculine declension 
First masculine declension has many alternations:

Examples of this include   'Leonidas',   'Augeas',   'Aristotle',   'Juvenal',   'Archilochus',   'Tacitus, and   'Taranto'. These suffixes can be omitted (etc.), but if we do so, the stems that end with a vowel must be lengthened with a j, even in nominative case ( 'Augeas',  'Menelaus',  'Livius', etc.). The lengthening of the stem is also present in other cases if one does not decide to omit the suffix. Other times, the suffix is considered as a part of the stem, such as   'Rhodes', and some can be declined both ways, such as  / 'Obol' and  / 'Alpine botanical garden'. Modern Greek names are considered not to have an ending in nominative (  'Macarios').
 The surname Nepos can have alternatively a stem Nepot- in other cases.
 some monosyllabic nouns have an  ending in genitive singular (  'bridge',   'lineage').
 Many nouns have the stem shortened in cases where the ending is not a null ending (as it is nominative singular), mainly because they have a fill vowel, which is there to ease the pronunciation. The change can be evident in writing, pronunciation, or both:
 In writing,  at the end of the stem is omitted in some loanwords     'Wilde' and     'Laforgue', but not in cases where that would affect the pronunciation of preceding letters, such as in  /   'Wallace' and     'George', except if it is preventing the nasalisation of the consonant + / that precede it, such as     'Lamartine'. If  is followed by other letters, it is kept in all cases, whether it is pronounced or not (    'Holmes' and     'Jacques').
In loanwords from other Slavic languages, fill vowels are preserved if the removal would break other grammatical rules.
For example, nominative  'father', dative/locative . Nowadays this ending is considered archaic or dialectal.
 Names ending in a vowel and consonant that is not pronounced are j-stem nouns, and can be written following hard or soft declension, but always pronounced as in soft declension. The added -j- is not written, only pronounced (  instrumental singular /  'Marat').
These are usually monosyllabic nouns.
This is a remnant of the Common Slavic masculine i-stem inflection, which was mostly lost in Slovene except for this ending. For example:  'student', nominative plural ,  'sir, lord', nominative plural ,  'farmer', nominative plural , etc. Usually, the regular form is also allowed, but rarely preferred.
 Some nouns (mostly those that have an ending  in genitive singular) have a null ending in genitive dual/plural (genitive plural  'hair',  genitive plural  'tooth'). Some can be declined either way (genitive plural /).
 About special stressed endings in plural, see mixed accent nouns.
 Few nouns show the effects of the Slavic second palatalisation in some of the plural forms:
 : nominative plural , locative dual/plural  'child'.
 : nominative plural  'wolf'.
 Many forms of the noun  'day' have two stems, a shorter one with only the consonants , and a longer one . The longer stem declines as a regular o-stem, while the shorter one has a unique set of endings not shared with any other noun. The formal, most appropriate declension, is a mix of both (the forms in brackets are colloquial):

 The masculine noun  'human, person' is suppletive. In the plural, the stem  is used, which follows the mobile-accent o-stem declension:

Fixed accent nouns 
Circumflex nouns have circumflex accent in all cases, however, the acute accent changes considerably.

 Nouns that have circumflex accent in nominative and genitive singular have long circumflex accent in all cases, except the nouns where the stressed vowel changes (e. g.); these follow mixed accent changes. Nouns that can also have mixed accent also follow the same rules, except if they have a null ending in genitive dual/plural; then they have all plural forms except vocative acute, but change to circumflex if used as an adverb and preceded by a preposition:  'hair', nominative plural , genitive plural , locative plural .

 Nouns that have long acute accent in nominative and genitive singular have circumflex accent in vocative and allow both in genitive, locative and instrumental plural, and locative dual. In collocations which are used as an adverb, and where the word lost the original meaning, the noun is only allowed to have circumflex accent in accusative and locative plural (e. g.  /  'on a mountain (lit. in mountains)'):

 Nouns that have short acute accent in nominative and genitive singular follow the same rules as long acute accented words, but all accents are short:

 Nouns that have circumflex accent in nominative singular and acute in genitive singular allow both forms in locative and dative singular when preceded by a preposition. The only exception are words in which open-mid vowel changes into a close-mid vowel. In these cases, it further depends which ending does it have in genitive plural. In collocations which are used as an adverb, and where the word lost the original meaning, the noun is only allowed to have circumflex accent in accusative and locative plural. (Note that due to simplicity, only the forms that are affected by this rule are shown; for example,  can also be declined without the change into close-mid vowel.)

Mobile accent nouns 
Mobile accent nouns transfer the stress to the following syllable in all cases but nominative, vocative, and accusative (if the same as nominative) singular.

 Nouns that have circumflex accent in genitive singular, although rare, have circumflex accent in all forms:

 Nouns that have acute accent in genitive singular change the accent the same way as fixed accent nouns with circumflex in nominative singular and acute in genitive singular when the stress is on the latter syllable and have acute accent when the stress in on the original syllable:

Ending accent nouns 
Short ending vowels are always circumflex while long ending ones follow the same pattern as mixed accent nouns that have circumflex accent in nominative singular and when the accent is on the stem, the accent is long and acute. There is a slight difference between soft and hard stems in genitive dual/plural, because soft declension only allows short circumflex accent whereas hard declension allows long acute and short circumflex.

Mixed accent nouns 
For the mixed accent nouns with long accent, many different factors determine the accent. The accent is usually circumflex, except in these cases:

 Genitive dual/plural, locative dual/plural and instrumental is acute if the accent is on the last syllable:  'human', genitive plural ,  'gift', genitive plural ,  'hair', genitive plural  (but  'castle', locative plural ). This happens in genitive case in all words, no matter the ending, and in words that do not have  lengthening in locative and instrumental. This rule does not necessarily apply to irregular nouns.
 Stressed vowel in nominative plural ending  is close-mid:  'hair', nominative plural ,  'man', nominative plural .
 Dative and locative singular is acute if the stressed vowel is open-mid (e or o):  'manure' .
 When used as an adverb, uncountable nouns or nouns that have ending  in locative dual/plural (those that do not lengthen the stem) allow both accents in locative singular. Words that can also have a form with open-mid vowel in locative singular.
 Nouns that allow both the stem or the ending to be accented usually have the stem accented when preceded by a preposition and have the ending accented when they are not.
 Dative and instrumental dual can have the accent either on the ending or the stem. If the accent is on the stem, it is long.
 Nouns that swich accent only in plural on in only one case follow fixed accent changes when the accent does not shift.
 Nouns can also colloquially have fixed accent. See fixed accent for that.

Here are declensions for some mixed accent nouns, but keep in mind that they have several different changes and only relevant forms are written:

Mixed accent nouns with short accent follow the same pattern as ending accent nouns (including the difference bətween soft and hard stems), except in nominative and vocative (and accusative if the same as nominative) singular, and dative and instrumental dual, where the accent is on the stem and acute if long:

Second masculine declension (masculine a-stem declension) 

Second masculine declension has the same endings as first feminine declension, however, not all alterations apply here. Animate and inanimate nouns are not declined differently, but the words that modify the noun still have those distinctions.

All nouns following the second masculine declension can also follow first masculine declension, but keeping the ending in nominative singular. They can also be feminized in dual and plural, following first feminine declension (essentially, the endings do not change).

Alternations and other exceptions of the second masculine declension 

 In nominative singular, some words, such as  'kamikaze', have an  ending.
 In genitive dual and genitive plural, nouns ending in consonant + , have an  inserted between, such as  genitive plural .

Accent 
Second masculine declension follow only fixed accent nouns. These can be circumflex or acute.

 Circumflex nouns are always circumflex:

 Acute accent changes into circumflex in genitive dual/plural and vocative case and is either acute or circumflex in istrumental singular:

Third masculine declension (masculine declension without endings) 
Third masculine declension follow nouns whose genitive singular (or in any other case) ending is a null ending. This includes all letters, as well as some other words, such as  'menace', / 'oh', and  'Cha-cha-cha'. There are, however, only a handful of words that feel natural to be declined this way; for many of them, it is preferred to be declined following the first masculine declension.

Alternations and other exceptions of the third masculine declension 

 Most of the time, nouns  'menace' and  'menaces' are considered one irregular noun istead of two nouns that only have a singular and a plural form, respectively. The infix is actually a personal pronoun  'he' in genitive case, but the dual form is still , and not with an infix  as would be expected:

Accent 
Words declined this way always have fixed accent, which is the same throughout, no matter if it is circumflex or acute, long or short. The only exception is vocative, where the accent is circumflex.

Fourth masculine declension (masculine i-/e-stem declension) 
The nouns following this declension were derived from an adjective, and are therefore nominalized adjectives. They are derived from the definite forms of the adjective, hence the ending  in nominative singular. This declension also differentiates between animate and inanimate nouns in the same way as the first one. The declension is the same as declension for masculine adjectives.

Some masculine nominalized adjectives, mostly proper nouns, are declined using first male declension. In addition, most of them have a null ending  in nominative singular, only rarely do they have an ending . Examples include   'Meden',   'Raztresen',   'April, May' etc.

Alternations and other exceptions of the fourth masculine declension 

 Vast majority nouns are declined as animate (accusative singular  'a Sunday issue of the newspaper Dnevnik').
 Other irregularities that adjectives and adjectival pronouns possess also apply here.
 For the different endings in nominative singular, see first adjective declension.

Accent 
These nouns decline the same way as definite masculine forms of adjectives following the first adjectival declension do. Therefore, only fixed and ending accentual types exist. For accent changes when nominalizing, see § Accent of nomnalized adjectives.

First feminine declension 
In plural, genitive case has a null ending (  'pitchfork').

The first feminine declension is the most common pattern for feminine nouns. There is no distinction between hard and soft stems (the declension used in modern Slovene was historically the soft one and the merge happened in Alpine Slavic).

Feminine a-stem declension 
The standard declension of first feminine declension is the a-stem declension.

Feminine r-stem declension 
This declension subtype follow only the nouns  'mother' and  'daughter'. They have a different stem in nominative singular than in other cases and numbers.. There are also minor changes to the endings in singular.

Feminine v-stem declension 
These inflect as r-stems, but with the i-stem instrumental singular ending  and have a null ending in nominative singular.

Feminine n-stem declension 
The endings are the same as for a-stem nouns. N-stem declension did not exist in Proto-Slavic (at least not for feminine nouns) and it evolved later.

Alternations and other exceptions of the first feminine declension 

 Some nouns have ending  (  'Melpomene'), silent  (    'Marguerite'),  (  'Clio'), or a null ending (  'Artemis'), but most of them also have regularvernacular versions. The non-vernacular versions can also be declined following the third feminine declension.
These also have vernacular versions for nominative singular.
 Mixed accent nouns have in nominative dual (along with the usual ending ) ending  that is accented ( /, nominative dual /).
 Nouns ending in a sonorant have an added fill vowel in genitive dual/plural. In some words, the fill vowel is not written, only pronounced (note that  and  represent only one sound when not followed by a vowel):  genitive dual/plural  'maidservant',  genitive dual/plural  'ship',  genitive dual/plural  'soil'.
 Nouns of which the stem ends in a vowel also have an added  in genitive dual/plural if without an ending:  genitive dual/plural  etc.
 The noun  'lady, madam' is irregular and has acute accent on all the endings except in vocative.

Fixed accent nouns 

 Circumflex nouns are always circumflex:

 Acute nouns have circumflex accent in vocative, genitive dual/plural and instrumental singular. When used as an adverb, accusative and instrumental singular can only be circumflex, and nouns that can also have mixed accent also have accusative plural circumflex:

 Acute nouns allow both tones in instrumental singular if the stressed vowel is open-mid:

 r-stem and v-stem nouns change the accent a bit differently; circumflex nouns are still circumflex in all cases, but acute ones change to circumflex in vocative, instrumental singular and genitive dual/plural. If the nouns also allow mixed accent, then the mixed accent declension follows the same rules:

Mobile accent nouns 
Mobile accent nouns are very rare and are always circumflex:

Ending accent nouns 

These nouns are short and circumflex, except if the accent is long; then they follow the same pattern as mixed accent nouns, but genitive dual/plural is circumflex if there is a null ending. The pattern is the same for words of which stems do not have a vowel and words which have the optional stress before the  →  shift.

Mixed accent nouns 

These nouns can only be acute in nominative singular, but the stressed endings are acute, except genitive case, where both forms are allowed and in instrumental singular, where it is acute. All words can also have fixed accent, but nouns that in genitive dual/plural have a null ending have the same form as in the mixed accent.

Second feminine declension (feminine i-stem declension) 
The second feminine declension is less common. It is used primarily by the widely productive abstract noun suffix , but a fair number of other nouns (mostly of Common Slavic origin) also follow it. The endings, however are different if the noun follows the mixed or ending accentual type that if the accent is always on the stem.

Alternations and other exceptions of the second feminine declension 

 Nouns with stems ending in  have an ending  in instrumental singular ( instrumental singular  'bed' (archaically)).
 When used as an adverb, some also change the accent e. g.  'in the spring', / '[to move something] off the way'

Fixed accent nouns 

 Nouns that are circumflex in nomnative and genitive singular have circumflex accent in all cases, and the short accent becomes long:

 Nouns that are acute in nominative and genitive singular follow two patterns, depending if the stress in (in that case) on the second to last syllable or is already before, which in regular nouns translates into whether the stress in on the penultimate on the last syllable in nominative singular:

 Noun that are circumflex in nominative singular and acute in genitive singular change the accent very similarly to acute  nouns. Vocative and Instrumental singular is circumflex, genitive dual/plural allows both accents, and locative dual/plural, instrumental dual and plural, and dative dual also allow both accents if the penultimate syllable is stressed.

Mobile accent nouns 

These nouns can be either circumflex or acute in nominative singular, but all of them are circumflex in all other forms:

Ending accent nouns 
There are two subtypes. The first one is not purely ending accent as it has accent on the stem in dative and locative singular and appears if a long fill vowel is stressed in nominative singular. In that case the e and o accented on the stem are open-mid. The other form is present if short fill vowel is stressed in nominative singular.

Mixed accent nouns 
These nouns can only be circumflex and follow the same pattern as ending accent nouns with long as a fill vowel.

Third feminine declension (feminine declension without endings) 
Third feminine declension follow nouns whose genitive singular (or in any other case) ending is a null ending.

Alternations and other exceptions of the third feminine declension 
 Some names can also follow first feminine declension ( / 'Ruth')
 Sometimes, nouns  'menace',  'two menaces', and  'menaces' are considered one irregular noun istead of three nouns that only have a singular, dual, and a plural form, respectively. The infix is actually a personal pronoun  'she' in genitive case:

Accent 
Words declined this way always have fixed accent, which is the same throughout, no matter if it is circumflex or acute, long or short. The only exception is vocative, where the accent is circumflex.

Fourth feminine declension (feminine i-/e-stem declension) 
The nouns following this declension were derived from an adjective, and are therefore nominalized adjectives. The declension is the same as declension for definite feminine adjectives.

This declension does not seem to have any alterations.

Accent 
These nouns decline the same way as definite masculine forms of adjectives following the first adjectival declension do. Therefore, only fixed and ending accentual types exist. For accent changes when nominalizing, see § Accent of nomnalized adjectives.

First neuter declension 
The vast majority of neuter nouns follow the first neuter declension.

Neuter o-/e-stem declension 
The neuter o-stem declension closely resembles its masculine counterpart. The nominative and accusative always have the same form, however, with endings that differ from the masculine nouns. The genitive dual/plural has no ending like in the feminine a-stems. The neuter o-stems are divided between "hard" and "soft" stems, like the masculines.

Neuter n-, s- and t-stem declensions 
A small group of neuter nouns follow the neuter n-stem, neuter s-stem or neuter t-stem declensions. These use the same endings as the o-stems (except in nominative and accusative singular), but there is an additional consonant infix that is present in all forms except the nominative/accusative singular. The n-stem and t-stem are soft in nominative/accusative singular, while in most s-stem nouns, the stem  before the infix changes into . Since these nouns in nominative/accusative singular already end in /, there is a null ending.

Alternations and other exceptions of the first neuter declension 
For example, nominative  'sea', dative/locative . Nowadays this ending is considered archaic or dialectal.
 A few neuter s-stem nouns show the effects of the Slavic first palatalisation in the forms with the infix :
 The noun  'eye' has the stem . It also has a shorter plural stem  when referring to human eyes. This stem is feminine rather than neuter, and follows the mixed i-stem declension.
 The noun  'ear' has the stem , with a change in accent type. The genitive plural allows both accents.
 The noun  'yoke' has the stem .
 Nouns without a vowel in the stem add a fill vowel  in genitive dual/plural.
 Noun  'firewood' is also irregular, having two forms for locative and instrumental: nominative plural  locative plural /, instrumental plural /. The irregular forms are preferred.
 Some nouns, such as  'intestine' (stem ) lose the infix in the plural: .

Fixed accent nouns 

 Circumflex nouns are always circumflex, except in plural, where the ones that lose the infix are acute in nominative/accusative plural and follow acute accentuation in other cases:

 Nouns that are circumflex in nominative singular and acute in genitive plural allow both accents in locative and dative singular after preposition and in dual. They are circumflex in plural and acute in other forms in singular. The exception is the word , which is acute in other forms, except in  vocative, where it is circumflex and genitive dual/plural, where it can also be circumflex:

 Most acute nouns have circumflex accent in plural and allow both accents in dual, except in vocative, where it is always circumflex:

If the noun is composed of more than three syllables, then they allow both accents no matter the stressed vowel. Dative plural is in all nouns accented the same as nominative plural. The accent in dual is either that of the singular or that of the plural form:

 Plurale tantum can additionally follow one of these two accent changes:

 Nouns  and  change the accent irregularly.  is circumflex in plural with close-mid vowel (alongside the regular open-mid vowel), even though it would be expected to be acute, and  can only be acute in nominative and accusative plural:

Mobile accent nouns 

These nouns are always acute in nominative singular, but can either be circumflex or acute in genitive singular. The circumflex stay circumflex in all other cases while acute ones further decline as fixed accent nouns which have short circumflex accent in nominative singular and are acute in genitive singular:

Ending accent nouns 
These nouns always have short accent, except in dative and instrumental singular, where the accent is the same (but acute if long) as their fixed accent counterparts (if the stem has a fill vowel, then the noun can also be declined as a fixed accent noun), or is long circumflex (acute according to Slovenski pravopis) open-mid  or long circumflex (acute according to Slovenski pravopis) closed-mid  if the stem does not have a vowel. Long vowel is also the fill vowel  in genitive dual/plural and if nouns have special ending in plural and some dual cases. Nouns, where the accent is not on the last syllable in genitive dual/plural, allow both accents in that case.

Mixed accent nouns 
Mixed accent nouns are always circumflex, except open-mid  and  allow both accents. Slovenski pravopis dictates that also closed-mid  and  allow both accents, but the Dictionary of Slovene written language does not.

Second neuter declension (neuter a-stem declension) 
Therefore, for the accent, endings, and alternations, see those three pronouns in the pronouns section.

Third neuter declension (neuter declension without endings) 
Third neuter declension follow nouns whose genitive singular (or in any other case) ending is a null ending. This declension does not seem to have any alterations.

Accent 
These accents can only have fixed accent, which does not change, except the acute accent changes into circumflex in vocative.

Fourth neuter declension (neuter i-/e-stem declension) 
The nouns following this declension were derived from an adjective, and are therefore nominalized adjectives. The declension is the same as declension for neuter adjectives. Most of these nouns are geographical names and only have a singular form. This declension also differentiates between hard and soft stems, but only in nominative and accusative singular.

This declension does not seem to have any alterations.

Accent 
These nouns decline the same way as definite feminine forms of adjectives following the first adjectival declension do. Therefore, only fixed and ending accentual types exist. For accent changes when nominalizing, see § Accent of nomnalized adjectives.

Nouns that switch gender 

 Some masculine nouns of Latin origin can be apart from being declined regularly in plural declined following the first neuter declension, such as  'fricative', nominative plural , genitive plural . The normal declension is usually preferred.
Neuter declension is mostly present only in locative after preposition . These nouns however, are commonly split into two versions, one following the feminine declension and one following neuter declension:

 Some mixed-accented neuter nouns can become masculine (along with the usual declension) in dual and plural, having an  infix and following first masculine declension.
 Nouns following second masculine declension can be feminine or masculine in dual and plural, but in either case they decline the same, as described above.
 Noun  when meaning 'eye' has plural , which further declines as a regular feminine i-stem noun with mixed accent.
 Noun  is in vast majority of examples neuter, but can also dialectally or archaically be feminine, but still following the same declension.

Nouns composed of two or more words 
When a noun composed of two or more words, sometimes all words are declined as they would be if alone, but there are additional rules.

Proper & common nouns 
If all parts of a proper nouns grammatically match then all of them are declined, such as    'Ivan Cankar' and   'Mokro Polje'. The exception are surnames of females, which in most cases follow third declensions and have the same ending in all cases (   'Majda Vrhovnik'), but surnames following female declensions (usually ending in ) can be also declined following the original declension (  / 'Ana Kopriva'). If both females and males with the same surname are mentioned, the surname is declined following original declension if the last name listed is male and follow the exception if the last name listed is female, but both first names are declined as they would normally:     →  (last listed first name is female) and  →  (last listed first name is male). In combination of two names, such as  'Šmarje–Sap' and  'Gozd Martuljek', both nouns are declined.

If the first part of a compound loanword is considered an adjective or is considered not to be able to stan by itself, then this part also follows third declensions, such as   'Down Street',   'Kon Tiki',   'Monte Carlo',   'U Thant',   'Mao Zedong', but some can be declined following the usual declension or the third, such as  / 'Rio de Janeiro'. Some of these names can also be shortened to only the first word, which in that case follows the usual declension   'Rio de Janeiro' and   'Mao'. Compound loanword nouns with unusual endings for their gender or number follow third declensions:   'Pickwhick Papers',   'École des Hautes Études'. Part of nouns, called  in Slovene (lit. forenames), part between the name and surname, which was originally usually an article, also follow third declensions:   ,   .

Some can be declined both ways, such as   / (Iskra company).

Vernacular & Vernacularized nouns 
In these cases, writing words together is favored

Non-vernacularized nouns 
Nouns that are not fully integrated in Slovene (are not fully vernacularized) are split into two categories: quoted and semi-quoted, depending on how much they are integrated.

All parts of masculine semi-quoted nouns are usually declined following the usual inflection pattern, which is either first, second, or fourth masculine declension, but some that have an unusual ending follow the third masculine declension:  , but  .

This declension is always stylistically marked.

Masculinization and feminization of neuter nouns 
Neuter nouns are either masculinized or feminized across a large part of the Slovene-speaking territory. Masculinization occurs in Upper Carniolan, Lower Sava Valley, Central Savinja, Horjul, Škofja Loka, Poljane, Selca, Črni Vrh, Ebriach, North Pohorje-Remšnik, and Mežica dialects, Kranjska Gora subdialect, and in parts of Rosen Valley, Juan Valley, Lower Carniolan, Central Styrian, and South Pohorje dialects. It is most commonly present in singular, and less in dual and plural. Masculinization varies from nouns binding with masculine forms of adjectives to completely change the declension, such as in Lower Sava Valley dialect. In that case nouns following the first neuter declension change to following first masculine, those following second neuter to following second masculine declension those following the third neuter to third masculine and those following fourth neuter to fourth masculine. Masculinized nouns following first declension have in genitive dual/plural a null ending, which is also present in some other masculine nouns. Mixed and mobile accentual type generally turns into fixed. Those following fourth declension have a null ending in nominative singular. The t-, s-, and n-stem nouns usually have the long stem in all cases.

Feminization of neuter nouns occurs in eatern Carinthian, northern Styrian, and many Panonian dialects. Feminization is the most common in plural, but is also very common in singular in dual. Similarly to masculinization, nouns following the first neuter declension change to following the first feminine, those following the second neuter to second feminine, those following the third neuter to third feminine and those following fourth neuter to fourth feminine. Mobile and mixed accentual type generally turn into fixed. The t-, s-, and n-stem nouns usually have the short stems in all cases, which is furthermore shortened, without the last o/e. The accent also changes accordingly to one syllable before, if the final o/e was accented.

Adjectives, adjectival pronouns, numerals 
Adjective declension is simpler than noun declension, as there are only two different inflection patterns. The first declension is the same as fourth noun declension for each case, while the second adjective declension is the same as third noun declensions (have a null ending in all cases). Adjectives can have all four accentual types. Adjectives can be compared in two ways, having three degrees of comparison in the first comparison (positive, comparative, superlative) and the second having two (positive and elative) and can be declined either by affixes or by adding other an adverb before it.

Declension of adjectival pronouns and irregular numerals is detailed in the pronouns and irregular numerals section.

Definite and indefinite adjectives 
Adjectives in Slovene distinguish between indefinite and definite meanings. They correspond in meaning to the distinction between the English indefinite article a, referring to an unknown thing, and the definite article the, referring to a known thing. The definite form is also used in fixed noun phrases, where the combination of adjective and noun are to be understood as a single concept. Apart from that, they are also used under the following conditions:
 After possessive adjectives:  'individual's financial contribution'.
 When the adjective denotes a special type of the noun:  'retake exam',  'mother tongue'.
 When nominalized: . 'The doctor on-call (lit. on duty) is here.'; some proper nouns are exceptions.

Thus, definite forms behave like relational adjectives, which already mostly have an  ending.

Definite adjectives have an ending  in nominative and vocative singular. All other forms are usually the same for regular adjectives, acting as both indefinite and definite adjective, but adjectives that do not have fixed accent and some irregular adjectives change the stem or the accent, so all forms are differentiated.

For some adjectives, however, there are more differences between the indefinite and definite declensions:

The only exception is when the stem does not have a vowel. Then it has ending accent.
 Some acute-stem adjectives (e.g. ) switch to circumflex accentuation in the definite declension: .
 The adjective  (with stem ) can additionally have circumflex accent on the stem and a close-mid vowel in the definite declension: .

In addition, not all adjectives have definite and indefinite form.

First adjective declension (adjective declension with endings) 
Most of the adjectives follow the first declension, which changes the endings when declined. These adjectives, when nominalized, follow fourth declensions. The endings can be split into three groups of cases:
 The nominative and accusative, which are like the o-stems of masculine and neuter nouns, and the a-stems of feminine nouns.
 The other feminine singular cases, which also follow the a-stems of nouns.
 The remaining cases, which have endings unique to adjectives. These are the same for all three genders in the dual and plural.

The accusative singular is different if the adjective stays directly before the noun or not. In the latter case, masculine form allows only genitive ending, feminine only accusative and neuter allows both endings.

The masculine accusative singular before the adjective is like either the nominative or the genitive, as in masculine nouns. Which form is used depends on which form the accompanying noun uses, which in turn depends on whether the noun is animate or inanimate.

Alternations and other exceptions of the first adjective declension 

 Adjectives with mixed accent also have a form with an ending -e in nominative and accusative dual in feminine and neuter gender in addition to the usual -i:  'white', nominative dual: //.
 A fill vowel in nominate singular when there is a null ending in some adjectives.

Fixed accent adjectives 
Adjectives do not nearly change the accent as much when declined as nouns, however there are six different ways that can happen:

 If the adjective is long circumflex (or short if  is accented) in nominative singular masculine and feminine form, then it is circumflex in all other forms.

 If the adjective is long acute (or short if  is accented) in nominative singular masculine and feminine form, then it is acute in all other forms, except in vocative, where it is circumflex.

 If the adjective is long circumflex (or short if  is accented) in nominative singular masculine form, but acute in feminine form, then it is acute in all other forms, except in vocative case, where it is circumflex.

 If the adjective is long acute (or short if  is accented) in nominative singular masculine form, but circumflex in feminine form, then it is acute in all masculine and neuter forms, but allows both accents in other feminine singular forms. The same applies if nominative singular feminine form allows both accents.

The same applies if nominative singular feminine form allows both accents.

Mobile accent adjectives 
Adjectives with mobile accent are acute in nominative singular masculine form and can be either circumflex or acute in feminine form. Circumflex ones change the accent in other forms the same way as fixed-accented adjectives that are acute in masculine and circumflex in feminine, and acute ones are always acute.

Ending accent adjectives 
Ending accents are usually stylistically marked and are circumflex when the ending is stressed, but the stem is acute (except fill vowels). Definite forms have fixed accent. If the stem does not have a vowel, then the first syllable is accentuated and acute if long. Some speakers can also accentuate indefinite forms the same as definite.

Mixed accent adjectives 
There are two different ways mixed accent adjectives are declined, with short or long stress on endings, most of them following the first way.

The first way can have, along with the fixed accentuation, the ending accented only in nominative and vocative singular neuter form, accusative singular feminine and neuter form, and nominative and vocative dual and plural in all forms. However, some of these accents are stylistically marked:

 If both fixed and ending accents are used about the same in nominative/vocative singular neuter form, then fixed accent is favored in other forms.
 If fixed accent is favored, but ending is not stylistically marked in nominative/vocative singular neuter form, then ending accent is stylistically marked in other forms.
 If ending accent is stylistically marked in nominative/vocative singular neuter form, then it can only have accent on the stem in other forms, forms with accent on the ending are obsolete.

Moreover, in nominative and accusative dual in feminine and neuter form these adjectives can also have a stylistically marked ending  in addition to the usual -i. They follow one of the fixed accent tone changes if the accent is on the stem. If the feminine nominative singular form is acute, then other accents are acute. If it is circumflex, then it is circumflex in all forms. The endings are always circumflex. Defnite forms have fixed accent that is the same as "other" forms. The exceptions are  when meaning 'offspring' or 'young people/animals', and  when it is nominalized or in collocations. These forms are always circumflex.

The second way with short accents is that the accent is on the stem only in nominative singular, and on the ending in all other forms. All adjectives following this pattern can also have fixed accent, and can only have fixed accent in definite forms. The ending is always short circumflex and definite form is acute.

Mobile & mixed accent adjectives 
These adjectives decline as mobile accent adjectives, but also have the ending-accentuated forms of the adjectivves following the first way of mixed accentual type.

Second adjective declension (adjective declension without endings) 
Some adjectives, especially the ones derived recently from loanwords ( 'beige',  'instant',  'pink' – derived from Italian  or German ) decline without changing the endings. When nominalized, they usually decline following third declensions. These adjectives also don't differentiate between definite and indefinite forms and the ending does not change when not followed by noun.

Accent 
The accent is always fixed and does not change, except in vocative, where acute changes into circumflex.

Words that can follow both declensions 
Cardinal numerals from five onward can be declined both ways. Smaller numbers (up to 100) are usually declined using first declension ( / 'five'), and bigger (1000 and onwards) using second declension ( / 'million'). Declining big numbers using first declension is really uncommon. Noun  'zero' can also be declined both ways. If the numeral is composed of more words, only the last one follows first declension ('one hundred five'). When all numerals are written with a number, they always follow second declension.

Formation of adverbs 
If not otherwise noted, adverbs keep the same tone as the adjective in nominative singular neuter form (the second form in the given examples below). Adverbs formed from fixed and mobile accent adjectives keep accent on the stem, those derived from ending accent nouns or from those following the second form of mixed accents (with short accents on ending) have the accent on the ending, which is long circumflex for hard stems and short circumflex for soft stems. Adverbs formed from mobile and mixed or only mixed nouns following the first pattern (with long accents on endings) can have the accent either on the stem or the ending. If the ending accent was stylistically marked in neuter nominative singular form, it is not marked, just less common.

  →  → 
  →  → 
  →  → 
  →  → 
  →  /  →  / 
  →  /  (stylistically marked) →  / 
  →  →  /  (stylistically marked)

Comparison 
For all adjectives, comparative, superlative and elative are formed periphrastically, using the adverbs  'more', / 'most', and  'too (much)' or many other adverbs similar in meaning, respectively. For some adjectives, especially more basic or old ones, the comparative and superlative can also be formed with affixes. These can still be compared periphrastically, but the form with affixes is usually favored.

Which one is used depends in a large part on the shape of the adjective's stem, although these are not hard rules and there are some exceptions. The superlative is formed from the comparative by prefixing  /  to it. Elative is formed from positive prefixng  to it. Elative can be formed periphrastically by all adjectives. If adjective can be compared periphrastically, this form is favored.

( → /).

Compared adjectives declines as either always acute or always circumflex fixed accent adjectives. Some adjectives lack positive and elative form; these are then sorted in dictionaries by the comparative.

After a vowel, d becomes j, and after r it disappears altogether. The suffix is also used with adjectives ending in -ok or -ek, which is dropped in the comparative, and along with the previous changes, t also changes to j and other consonants are iotated.

  (stem ) → 
  (stem ) → 
  (stem ) → 
  (stem ) → 
  (stem ) → 
  → 
  → 
  → 

The suffix  is used with one-syllable adjectives ending in g, h or k. In the comparative, these change to their palatalised variants ž, š and č respectively. Again, the suffix is dropped and the final consonant is iotated. The stem is always circumflex, the only exception is the last example.

  (stem ) → 
  (stem ) → 
  (stem  or ) → 
  (stem  or ) → 
  → 
  → 
  →  (stylistically marked)

The suffix  is used in all other cases, including one-syllable adjectives ending in more than one consonant or adjectives with more than one syllable. Some adjectives keep the accent on the stem, and is then the same as the stem accent in nominative singular neuter form, or the suffix may be circumflex accented  with an open-mid vowel. The latter case is more typical for ending and mixed accent adjectives while the first form is more typical for fixed and mobile accent adjectives.

  (stem ) → 
  (stem  or ) →  / 
  → 
  (stem ) → 
  (stem ) → 
  → 
  →

Comparison of adverbs 
Those declined with suffix , which have č, š, or ž before the ending can also have ending . Only the ending  allows accent on the ending, in other forms only fixed accent remains. The accent also changes the same way as with adjectives, the three exceptions are the last two examples, where comparative allows both accents.

  / → 
  /  →  / 
  /  → 
  →  / 
  →  / 
  →  / 
  → 
  /  →  /  /  (stylistically marked)
  /  →  /  (stylstically marked)

Accent of nominalized adjectives 
Nominalized adjectives and adverbs that form a collocation with a preposition (such as ) 'since chiildhood'(lit. since young) are always circumflex if disyllabic and have accent on the first syllable in definite masculine nominative singular form. When nominalized nouns are a proper noun, then they are also circumflex. Otherwise, they keep accent the same.

Pronouns 
Pronouns declined and therefore detailed here can be either nominal or adjectival and follow one of the respective declensions, although many of them are heavily irregular; these are detailed here.

Nominal Pronouns 
Nominal pronouns, apart from personal pronouns are of two types; first are used to refer to people and are masculine gender, and other are used for everything else and are neuter gender. Exception are nominal pronouns which are the same gender as the noun they represent.

Personal pronouns 
Personal pronouns have in some cases up to four forms. The accusative, genitive and dative forms have stressed and unstressed forms; the stressed forms are used when particular emphasis is needed. The accusative also has a form used when preceded by a monosyllabic preposition,  'through' (which is changed to skọ̑z-), or  'in' (which is changed into vȃ-) that is combined with the preposition, such as  'on' +  'me', which are combined into  'on me' and  'in, into' +  'you', which are combined into  'into you'. Stressed combining form also exist, however they are considered archaic and do not actually combine with the preposition (for example,  'on me'). Instead of combining forms, usual stressed forms can also be used.

Different forms are in the table below written as unstressed / streesed / combining / stressed combining. Note that not all pronouns have all expected forms in each case and number.

The first and second person singular pronouns are very irregular, and follow their own declension (second neuter declension). The nominative forms of the dual and plural have different forms for the genders, depending on who is speaking or who is being spoken to. The combining forms exist only in singular.

The reflexive pronouns are used to refer back to the subject or to some other word, and have only a single set of forms for all three numbers, which inflect like the first- and second-person singular pronouns. There is no nominative form.

The third-person pronouns inflect similar to the fourth declensions, but irregularly. The nominative is formed from a different stem than the other cases. The combining forms in masculine and neuter singular have two different versions, the latter being used when combining with a preposition that does not end with a vowel, which are skozi "through" (skozenj), pred "in from of, before" (predenj), and čez "over, in a certain amount of time" (čezenj).

Use of pronouns as a subject, stressed & undstressed forms 
The subject in Slovene is often omitted when it consists only of personal pronouns, so use of them as a subject is not so common. As a subject, personal pronouns are used only in the following cases, which are the same as when a stressed form is used instead of the unstressed one:

 To emphasize the subject: ! 'You won't teach me!'
 If the subject has a grammatical modifier: . 'I also don't know what to do.";  … 'I, the King of XY, am commanding …'
 When implying a dfference: . 'He was there, not you.'
 In some coordinate relations: . 'Janez and I are going to see the castle.', but . 'I don't know what to do' allow the omission.
 After prepositions (except when combining form is used), stressed versions are used:  '(run, walk, come etc.) to you',  'behind me',  'against her',  'without you (plural)'.

Interrogative nominal pronouns 
The interrogative pronouns  'who' and  'what' have only singular forms, and have irregular stem changes.  also replaces the normal -g- in the genitive with -s-.

Relative nominal pronouns 
The ending -j is also dropped.

Relative indefinite pronouns 

Indefinite nominal pronouns 
Pronoun  can also have a prefix , which is declined the same: / 'quite a few people' .

Negative nominal pronouns 

Universal nominal pronouns 

Manifold nominal pronouns 
Manifold pronouns are formed by adding a prefix to the interrogative pronouns and are thus declined the same way. Prefixes  and  can also be written as a separate word.

Unspecified nominal pronouns 
These are  'someone arbitrary' and  'something arbitrary', which are written and declined the same as interrogative pronouns, but interrogative  has a different accent. 'Grab something to eat.'. The difference between these pronouns and indefinite pronouns is that one is not obliged to do anything. In the example sentence, the subject is not obliged to grab anything, but in the sentence , which would be translated the same, the subject is obliged to grab something.

Adjectival pronouns 
Most of the adjectival pronouns are regular and follow first adjective declension.

Relative unspecified adjectival pronouns and demonstrative pronouns ending in -le 
In these cases, the pronoun it consists of is declined as usual and the suffix is added at the end. Thus endings turn into infixes.

The demonstrative  "this" inflects like an adjective, but -i- in the endings is replaced with -e-. Many of the forms have shortened alternatives, including cases of non-final short accents.

The word  "all" and inflects much like , but it inflects as if it were a soft stem, having -e in the neuter nominative/accusative singular. All the accents are short, even those in a non-final syllable, where [ə] is pronounced.

Numerals 
Numeral  'one' and its derivatives have a definite form  in nominative singular when nominalized, but others are the same. Numerals  'two' and  have -i- in endings replaced with -e- and numerals  'three' and  'four' have a different ending in nominative and accusative. Numeral  also changes the -i- in the ending to -e- in other cases. Other cardinal numerals have a null ending in all genders in nominative, vocative, and accusative (example  'five'). They also change the accent irregularly in nominative and accusative:

Note that this changes occur only when numerals follow first adjective declension. When following second declension, numerals have a nominative form throughout. For more information regarding which declension they follow, see section words that can follow both declensions.

Dialectal and obsolete declension changes 
There are many dialectal changes, with the most common being:

 Neuter o-stem alternatively have ending  in nominative singular.
 Feminine v-stem nouns can decline as a-stems.
 Locative singular became the same as dative singular.
 Archaic ending -e in o-stem locative singular is still present in archaic northern Littoral dialects.
 Simplification of irregular nouns into regular.
 Change of non-final vowels in endings to a (e. g. )

Many different endings can also appear in general colloquial speech:

 Loss of dual, especially when ending in vowel +  + vowel.

There are also some obsolete styles of declension lost in modern Slovene:

 No distinction between soft and hard stems. (the current differences occurred in 19th century)
 Noun  still followed i-stem declension up to 19th century.
 Dative and locative were the same for nominal declensions in 15th century.
 Comparative and superlative used to be indeclinable.
 Special endings for vocative case.

Declension with tone changes 
In the southeastern part of Brda dialect, the modern vowel reduction was so developed that a new way of declining nouns was developed. Brda dialect lost the original tonal oppositions, but they developed them back in a new way, so more cases can be distinguished:

References

General

Dialectal declension

Obsolete features

Examples 

 

Slovene grammar
Declension